EIA-608, also known as "line 21 captions" and "CEA-608", was once the standard for closed captioning for NTSC TV broadcasts in the United States, Canada and Mexico. It was developed by the Electronic Industries Alliance and required by law to be implemented in most television receivers made in the United States.

It specifies an "Extended Data Service", which is a means for including a VCR control service with an electronic program guide for NTSC transmissions that operates on the even line 21 field, similar to the TeleText based VPS that operates on line 16 which is used in PAL countries.

EIA-608 captions are transmitted on either the odd or even fields of line 21 with an odd parity bit in the non-visible active video data area in NTSC broadcasts, and are also sometimes present in the picture user data in ATSC transmissions. It uses a fixed bandwidth of 480 bit/s per line 21 field for a maximum of 32 characters per line per caption (maximum four captions) for a 30 frame broadcast.  The odd field captions relate to the primary audio track and the even field captions related to the SAP or secondary audio track which is generally a second language translation of the primary audio, such as a French or Spanish translation of an English-speaking TV show.

Raw EIA-608 caption byte pairs are becoming less prevalent as digital television replaces analog. ATSC broadcasts instead use the EIA-708 caption protocol to encapsulate both the EIA-608 caption pairs as well as add a native EIA-708 stream.  EIA-608 has had revisions with the addition of extended character sets to fully support the representation of the Spanish, French, German languages, and cross section of other Western European languages.  EIA-608 was also extended to support two byte characters for the Korean and Japanese markets.  The full version of EIA-708 has support for more character sets and better caption positioning options; however, because of existing EIA-608 hardware and revisions to the format, there has been little or no real world use of the format besides simple 608 to 708 inline conversions.

Channels
EIA-608 defines four channels of caption information, so that a program could, for example, have captions in four different languages. There are two channels, called 1 and 2 by the standard, in each of the two fields of a frame. The channels are often presented to users numbered simply as CC1-2 for the odd field and CC3-4 for the even field.  Due to bandwidth limitations on either field, CC1 and  CC3 are the only ones used, meaning that there has been little use for the second channel.  Early Spanish SAP captioned broadcasts first used the second channel CC2 because the original caption decoders only read the first odd field, but later switched to using CC3 for bandwidth reasons.  Due to the same bandwidth reasons XDS was never used by Spanish-speaking stations.

Within each channel, there are two streams of information which might be considered sub-channels: one carries "captions" and the other "text." The latter is not in common use due to the lack of hardware support and bandwidth available.  Text is signaled by the use of text commands and can be used for a formatted URL string with a 16-bit checksum that designates a web site that the captions relate to or a local station communication channel.0

This layering is based on the OSI Protocol Reference Model:

DVD GOP User Data Insertion
The user data structure that follows a H.262 GOP header is as follows (the same would apply after an ISO/IEC 14496-2 GOP header):

bslbf: bit string, left bit first ; uimsbf: unsigned integer, most significant bit first

Caption blocks are inserted after the sequence and GOP headers, so each block is for one second of video which would end up being one or two long lines or three to four short lines of text.  Also that means if the caption_block_count is greater than 30 then the block contains both interleaved caption fields and one could devise the framing rate from the caption_block_count.  However since the data is grouped together the framing rate will almost always be 30/1.001, unlike the ATSC method that inserts one byte pair for each field after the picture header making framing rates of 24/1.001 possible for HD content.  Since when a decoder does a 3:2 pull-down for NTSC output the captions will remain in sync.

DVB Transport Insertion
The packet-ed structure that is inserted before the H.222 video packet is as follows for a frame of associated video:

bslbf: bit string, left bit first ; uimsbf: unsigned integer, most significant bit first

This structure was designed for any digital VBI data and was optimized to carry three or more 43-byte Teletext packets. e.g. a page header and two associated lines.  For Teletext subtitles, the data_unit_id is set to 3.  In this form, captions have to be separated into byte pairs spread over frames in one second of video rather than grouped into one block as with the DVD structure.  The same is true for Teletext subtitles with more than one line of text.

SDI/MXF SMPTE 291M Insertion
The packet-ed structure that is inserted before the SMPTE 259M active video frame or MXF essence video packet is coded as follows for a frame of associated video:

bslbf: bit string, left bit first ; uimsbf: unsigned integer, most significant bit first

This structure was designed for any digital audio or metadata that is to be synchronized  with a video frame.  SDI transports every eight bits in a 10 bit aligned packet, unlike MXF which is byte aligned and the ancillary flag bytes are replaced by 128 bit header.

Extended Data Service

The EIA-608 data stream format includes Extended Data Service (XDS), a variety of information about the transmission. It is all optional,:
 
 
 program name
 offensiveness rating (violence, sex, etc.)
 program category (drama, game show, etc.)

Characters
There are three sets of characters that the EIA-608 stream can direct the receiver to display: basic characters, special characters, and extended characters. A single two-byte EIA-608 command (represented by a single VBI line) can specify two basic characters, one special character, or one extended character.

Extended characters are a later addition to the standard and their decoding is optional.

EIA-608 provides controls for the color of the foreground and background of the text, underlining, blinking, and italics. The default color scheme is white characters on a black background, all opaque.

The Transparent Space special character implies a transparent background even in the absence of any background control commands. As the foreground of this character is a blank space, it really means a gap in the close caption text.

Non-Caption Data
This is used to either pad out the field line when no captions are sent or for the eXtended Data Service.
          +-+-+-+-+-+-+-+-+ +-+-+-+-+-+-+-+-+              +-+-+-+-+-+-+-+-+ +-+-+-+-+-+-+-+-+
 null pad |P|0|0|0|0|0|0|0| |P|0|0|0|0|0|0|0| XDS metadata |P|0|0|0| CLASS | |P|0|0|0|  TYPE | 
          +-+-+-+-+-+-+-+-+ +-+-+-+-+-+-+-+-+              +-+-+-+-+-+-+-+-+ +-+-+-+-+-+-+-+-+
          15             8   7             0               15             8   7             0

Basic North American character set
A command with bits 13 or 14 on directs the receiver to display two basic characters at the current cursor position for the current mode (closed caption or text). Each character is a code point (identifies the character to display), as follows.
                       +-+-+-+-+-+-+-+-+ +-+-+-+-+-+-+-+-+
  modified 7-bit ASCII |P|  CHARACTER1 | |P|  CHARACTER2 |
                       +-+-+-+-+-+-+-+-+ +-+-+-+-+-+-+-+-+
                       15             8   7             0

The code is almost identical to ASCII; the exceptions are shown in red.

In the table above, SB represents a solid block. The apostrophe (code 27), which may originally have been intended to be a neutral apostrophe as in ASCII, is now recommended to be rendered as a right single quotation mark (Unicode U+2019). For a neutral single quote/apostrophe, the plain single quote from the extended character set should be used.

Special North American character set
The only typical use in North America of this set is the use of the eighth note character to denote changes from spoken dialogue to singing or musical only scenes.

It is an acceptable broadcast engineering practice when translating EIA-608 to Teletext for PAL compatible countries to substitute this character for a number sign because of its similarity to a sharp.

A command to display a special character has a first byte of 0x11 or 0x19 (depending upon channel). The second byte is a code point in the range 0x30–0x3F as follows.

 +-+-+-+-+-+-+-+-+ +-+-+-+-+-+-+-+-+
 |P|0|0|1|C|0|0|1| |P|0|1|1|  CHAR |
 +-+-+-+-+-+-+-+-+ +-+-+-+-+-+-+-+-+
 15             8   7             0
 P = odd parity ; C = second channel toggle

TM is short for unregistered trademark and should be represented in superscript (™). TS in the table above represents a "transparent space" or non-breaking space. Finally, the Eighth note (♪) is used to denote singing or background music in captions.

Extended Western European character set
 +-+-+-+-+-+-+-+-+ +-+-+-+-+-+-+-+-+
 |P|0|0|1|C|0|1|S| |P|0|1|CHARACTER|
 +-+-+-+-+-+-+-+-+ +-+-+-+-+-+-+-+-+
 15             8   7             0
 P = odd parity ; C = second channel toggle ; S = char set toggle

These extended character sets are rarely used due to most European countries using the BBC Ceefax based Teletext system.

The Ceefax system is more prone to character errors due to the greater number of data bits (337 versus 16) encoded per VBI field, these errors occur either on noise prone analog transmissions or connections.

 A command to display an extended Spanish/French or miscellaneous character has a first byte of 0x12 or 0x1A (depending upon channel).
 A command to display an extended Portuguese/German/Danish character has a first byte of 0x13 or 0x1B (depending upon channel).

The second byte is a code point in the range 0x20-0x3F is as follows

SM is short for service mark and should be represented in superscript.  The single quote mark is a curly left and double quote marks are curly left and right.  The plus signs refer to top left, top right, lower left and lower right corners for box drawing.

Non-Western Norpak Character Sets
When used all standard and extended character sets are unused in favor of the following predefined sets, care must be taken to not emulate any control commands. This is an extension submitted to the CEC by Norpak who made a similar extension to the Teletext format for the Chinese market. The main use has been to provide double byte code point captioning to the Japanese, Taiwanese and South Korean markets.  A command to switch character sets has a first byte of 0x17 or 0x1F (depending upon channel). The second byte is a character set reference in the range 0x24-0x2A as follows

 +-+-+-+-+-+-+-+-+ +-+-+-+-+-+-+-+-+
 |P|0|0|1|C|1|1|1| |P|0|1|0|CHARSET|
 +-+-+-+-+-+-+-+-+ +-+-+-+-+-+-+-+-+
 15             8   7             0

Control commands
Bits 15 and 7 are always odd parity bits. Bit 11 is always the channel bit.

Preamble address code with masking bit 15,11 and 7 as already defined above
can be interpreted from following table

 
Row Preamble Standard Address and Style
(Default Row 11 = 0,top rows 1-4 = 1-2,bottom rows 12-13 = 3)
                +-+-+-+-+-+-+-+-+ +-+-+-+-+-+-+-+-+                  +-+-+-+-+-+-+-+-+ +-+-+-+-+-+-+-+-+
 preamble style |P|0|0|1|C|0|ROW| |P|1|N|0|STYLE|U| preamble address |P|0|0|1|C|0|ROW| |P|1|N|1|CURSR|U|
                +-+-+-+-+-+-+-+-+ +-+-+-+-+-+-+-+-+                  +-+-+-+-+-+-+-+-+ +-+-+-+-+-+-+-+-+
                15             8   7             0                   15             8   7             0
Row Preamble Extended Address and Style
(Bottom Rows 14-15 = 0,middle rows = 5-10 = 1-3)
                +-+-+-+-+-+-+-+-+ +-+-+-+-+-+-+-+-+                  +-+-+-+-+-+-+-+-+ +-+-+-+-+-+-+-+-+
 preamble style |P|0|0|1|C|1|ROW| |P|1|N|0|STYLE|U| preamble address |P|0|0|1|C|1|ROW| |P|1|N|1|CURSR|U|
                +-+-+-+-+-+-+-+-+ +-+-+-+-+-+-+-+-+                  +-+-+-+-+-+-+-+-+ +-+-+-+-+-+-+-+-+
                15             8   7             0                   15             8   7             0
 P = odd parity ; C = second channel toggle
 U = underline toggle ; N = next row down toggle
 (if style or cursor position not set,
  defaults are regular white text with black background
  at cursor = 0, cursor - multiple of 4)
 text style enumerations:
  {white=0,green,blue,cyan,red,yellow,magenta,italic white}

The row bits specify which of the fifteen screen rows should contain the caption text: row 11 (0000), 1 (0010), 2 (0011), 3, 4, 12, 13, 14, 15, 5, 6, 7, 8, 9, or 10 (1111).

The attributes bits allow 16 possibilities, which are: white (0000), green, blue, cyan, red, yellow, magenta, italics, indent 0, indent 4, indent 8, indent 12, indent 16, indent 20, indent 24, indent 28 (1111).

For a midrow code these are as follows: Bits 14, 13, 10, 9, 6 and 4 are always 0, bits 12, 8 and 5 are always 1. Bits 3, 2 and 1 form the color attribute 0001X10X(see the listing of attributes). Bit 0 indicates underline.

Mid Row Style Change
(style remains in effect until either next change or end of row signaled by a control or preamble)
           +-+-+-+-+-+-+-+-+ +-+-+-+-+-+-+-+-+              +-+-+-+-+-+-+-+-+ +-+-+-+-+-+-+-+-+
  bg color |P|0|0|1|C|0|0|0| |P|0|1|0|COLOR|T| midrow style |P|0|0|1|C|0|0|1| |P|0|1|0|STYLE|U|
           +-+-+-+-+-+-+-+-+ +-+-+-+-+-+-+-+-+              +-+-+-+-+-+-+-+-+ +-+-+-+-+-+-+-+-+
           15             8   7             0               15             8   7             0
       +-+-+-+-+-+-+-+-+ +-+-+-+-+-+-+-+-+            +-+-+-+-+-+-+-+-+ +-+-+-+-+-+-+-+-+
 no bg |P|0|0|1|C|1|1|1| |P|0|1|0|1|1|0|1| black text |P|0|0|1|C|1|1|1| |P|0|1|0|1|1|1|U|
       +-+-+-+-+-+-+-+-+ +-+-+-+-+-+-+-+-+            +-+-+-+-+-+-+-+-+ +-+-+-+-+-+-+-+-+
       15             8   7             0             15             8   7             0
 P = odd parity ; C = second channel toggle
 T = partially transparent ; U = underline toggle
 bg color enumerations:
 {white=0,green,blue,cyan,red,yellow,magenta,black}

For other control codes these are as follows: Bits 14, 13, 9, 6 and 4 are always 0, bits 12, 10 and 5 are always 1. Bit 8 chooses between line 21 and 284. Bits 3, 2, 1 and 0 identify the particular action.

The command bits allow 16 possibilities, which are: resume caption loading (0000), backspace (0001), delete to end of row (0100), roll-up captions 2-rows, roll-up captions 3 rows, roll-up captions 4-rows, flash on (0.25 seconds once per second), resume direct captioning, text restart, resume text display, erase displayed memory, carriage return, erase nondisplayed memory, end of caption (1111).

For tabs these are as follows: Bits 14, 13, 6, 4, 3, 2 are always 0, bits 12, 10, 9, 8, 5 are always 1. Bits 1 and 0 determine the number of tab offsets.

Considering parity bit already ignored hex value have of 2 byte data is following command:

References

External links
 Closed caption decoder requirements for analog television receivers – 47 C.F.R. 15.119 – From the F.C.C.
 Index of requirements documents in text and PDF for 47 C.F.R. 15 – use the 119 link – From the F.C.C.
 ANSI/CTA-608-E S-2019 – Latest revision of the standard from the Consumer vTechnology Association, free of charge

Broadcast engineering
EIA standards